Think Entertainment is a defunct production company owned by actress Shelley Duvall to produce children's television and films. During its first years the company had a first look deal with MCA/Universal who distributed some of their titles such as Shelley Duvall's Bedtime Stories.

History
Think Enetertainment was jointly owned by Duvall and her Cable MSO partners, consisting of Tele-Communications Inc., United Artists Entertainment, and Newhouse Broadcasting. Duvall bought out the MSO partners in February 1991. In 1993, Think partnered with UK-based Enchante, Ltd. owned by Ayman Sawaf following the expiration of the first look deal with MCA/Universal in November 1992. Enchante had bought out half of the production company.

Productions
 Mrs. Piggle-Wiggle (1994)
 Shelley Duvall's Bedtime Stories (1992)
 Stories from Growing Up (1991) 
 Nick Jr. Rocks (1991) 
 Nightmare Classics (1989)

References

Film production companies of the United States
Television production companies of the United States
American film studios
American companies established in 1988